"Butterflies" is a song by Skrillex, Starrah and Four Tet. It was released as a single through Atlantic Records and Owsla on May 10, 2021. It was described as "nostalgic house" by NME.

Background and release
The song was recorded in February 2020 but continued to be tweaked until a few weeks prior to release. In an interview with Annie Mac, Skrillex stated that he met up with Four Tet and produced the song, commenting that it was one of his last projects before the coronavirus lockdowns. In March 2021, Skrillex wrote on Instagram that he had new music coming "soon". The track was released on May 10, 2021.

Two edits were released, a 3:16 version and a 5:30 extended version.

Personnel
The song was written by Skrillex, Four Tet, Starrah, and Bibi Bourelly. It was produced by Skrillex and Four Tet, and includes vocals from Starrah.

Charts

References

2021 songs
Skrillex songs
Four Tet songs
Songs written by Starrah
Songs written by Bibi Bourelly
Songs written by Skrillex